The Montemont Islands are an island group in the Coral Sea, belonging to Papua New Guinea. They lie to the east of Panarairai Island in the Louisiade Archipelago.

Administrative
Politically they belong to the province of Milne Bay in the southeastern part of Papua New Guinea.
They are controlled by the chief of Utian Island, the nearest inhabited island.

Geography
The Montemont Islands consists of two small low-lying islands. They lie on the southwestern edge of the barrier reef of Vanatinai.

References

Archipelagoes of Papua New Guinea
Islands of Milne Bay Province
Louisiade Archipelago